The 2007 International Pokka 1000km was the sixth round of the 2007 Super GT season and the 36th running of the 1000 km Suzuka. It took place on August 19, 2007.

Race results
Results are as follows:

Statistics
GT500 Pole Position – #3 Hasemi Z – 1:55.781
GT300 Pole Position – #2 Privee Shiden – 2:06.838
GT500 Fastest Lap – #23 NISMO Z – 1:57.998
GT300 Fastest Lap – #2 Privee Shiden – 2:07.515
Winner's Race Time – 6:04:10.983

References

Suzuka 1000km